Melvin Dean Kelley (September 23, 1931 – January 13, 1996) was an American basketball player who competed in the 1952 Summer Olympics.

He was part of the American basketball team, which won the gold medal. He played six matches.

He later played three seasons for the Peoria Cats from (1956-59) Amateur Athletic Union (AAU) team, winning a championship there in 1958.

He was the brother of 1960 Summer Olympics gold medalist Allen Kelley.

References

External links
profile

1931 births
1996 deaths
American men's basketball players
Basketball players at the 1952 Summer Olympics
Basketball players at the 1955 Pan American Games
Fort Wayne Pistons draft picks
Kansas Jayhawks men's basketball players
Medalists at the 1952 Summer Olympics
Olympic gold medalists for the United States in basketball
Pan American Games gold medalists for the United States
Peoria Caterpillars players
United States men's national basketball team players
Pan American Games medalists in basketball
Medalists at the 1955 Pan American Games